Zvarykino is a rural locality (a selo) in Alexeyevsky District, Belgorod Oblast, Russia. The population was 36 as of 2010. There are 3 streets.

Geography 
Zvarykino is located 28 km southwest of Alexeyevka (the district's administrative centre) by road. Khreshchaty is the nearest rural locality.

References 

Rural localities in Alexeyevsky District, Belgorod Oblast
Valuysky Uyezd